The Para dog-faced bat (Cynomops paranus), also called the brown dog-faced bat, is a South American bat species of the family Molossidae. It is found in Panama, Colombia, Ecuador, Peru, Venezuela, Guyana, Suriname, French Guiana, Brazil, and northern Argentina.

Taxonomy and etymology
It was described as a subspecies of the southern dog-faced bat, Cynomops planirostris. Its trinomen was Molossus planirostris paranus (at the time, the southern dog-faced bat was Molossus planirostris). In 1998, it was split from the southern dog-faced bat, and was elevated to its own species, Cynomops paranus.

Its species name "paranus" refers to the Brazilian state of Pará. Thomas obtained the specimens used to describe the taxa from the Museu Paraense Emílio Goeldi located in Belém, Pará.

Description
Overall, it is similar in appearance to the southern dog-faced bat. The fur of its chest and belly are darker in color. As a free-tailed bat, its tail extends beyond the edge of the uropatagium.

Range and habitat
It has been documented in the following South American countries: Argentina, Bolivia; Brazil; Colombia; Ecuador; French Guiana; Guyana; Paraguay; Peru; Suriname; and Venezuela.

Conservation
It is evaluated as data deficient by the IUCN. A more informative classification because there is little-to-no information about its current range, population size and trend, nor its ecological requirements. Part of the challenge in identifying the status of the species is that it is often confused with other species in its genus. Therefore, its exact range is unclear. Also, like other free-tailed bats, it flies high as it forages, and therefore is not frequently encountered by researchers and collectors.

References

Cynomops
Bats of South America
Bats of Brazil
Mammals of Argentina
Mammals of Bolivia
Mammals of Colombia
Mammals of Ecuador
Mammals of French Guiana
Mammals of Guyana
Mammals of Paraguay
Mammals of Peru
Mammals of Suriname
Mammals of Venezuela
Fauna of the Amazon
Mammals described in 1901
Taxa named by Oldfield Thomas